Plympton–Wyoming is a town in the Canadian province of Ontario, located in Lambton County immediately east of Sarnia. It is the seat of the Lambton County Council.

The town's first mayor was Patricia Davidson, who was elected to the House of Commons of Canada in the 2006 federal election as the Conservative Member of Parliament for Sarnia—Lambton. Davidson also served as mayor of the village of Wyoming for ten years prior to her election as mayor of the amalgamated town. Davidson was succeeded as mayor by former town councillor and deputy mayor Lonny Napper in March 2006. The township is governed by a seven-member Council, including a Mayor and Deputy Mayor.

The name Wyoming derives from the Munsee name xwé:wamənk, meaning "at the big river flat." Plympton is named after Plympton in Devon, England.

History
The town was created in 2001, amalgamating the Township of Plympton with the formerly independent Village of Wyoming.

The township of Plympton was established in 1833 by settlers under the patronage of Lord Egremont, at roughly the same time as the settlement of Camlachie, Ontario.

The pre-amalgamation Village of Plympton was a party to a Supreme Court of Canada case in 1980, Homex Realty and Development v. Wyoming, which addressed issues of procedural fairness with regard to the village's municipal bylaws regarding property transfer.

On May 2, 1983, an F4 tornado tore through the town, injuring 13 and levelling / sweeping away multiple houses leaving dozens homeless. It tracked for 30 km (19 mi) and had a peak width of 400 m (1,300 ft). Winds topped out at an estimated 400 km/h (250 mph).

Communities
The main population centre is Wyoming. The town also comprises the communities of Aberarder, Beverly Glen, Blue Point, Blue Point Bay, Bonnie Doone, Camlachie, Errol, Gallimere Beach, Hillsborough Beach, Huron Heights, Kennedy Acres, Kertch, Mandaumin, Reece's Corners, Uttoxeter, Wanstead and Wellington Beach.

The town has three public schools, Errol Village Public School, Aberarder Central School, and Plympton–Wyoming Public School. The town has one Catholic separate school, Holy Rosary Catholic School. The town has one private Christian School, Wyoming John Knox Christian School, operating since the 1950s, with a school being built in 1958; the school is associated with the Christian Reformed tradition and with Edvance, an Ontario network of Christian schools. The area has no secondary schools, with different areas falling into the catchment areas for other local secondary schools such as North Lambton Secondary School, Lambton Central Collegiate Vocational Institute, St. Patrick's Catholic High School, and Northern Collegiate Institute and Vocational School.

The area has at least eight documented places of worship, including two United churches, a United Reformed Churches in North America affiliated church, an Associated Gospel Churches of Canada affiliated church, an Anglican Church, a Canadian Baptists of Ontario and Quebec church and a Christian Reformed Church in North America church. Wyoming's Roman Catholic Church closed in June 2007 in a parish reorganization by the Diocese of London.

Industry
The Town of Wyoming has a mix of industry, with light manufacturing including approximately 100 employed in publishing  and 25 in grain processing. Smaller employers include a credit union branch, a convenience store, Broadway Automotive Services, electric bike store, a fireplace installer, a Foodland location, a cheese store, a pharmacy, an agricultural equipment dealer, a consumer automobile dealer and an arborist service. There is also Godfather’s Pizza and the NHL Hunter family has Huntzy’s Pizza in Wyoming.
Outside of the town, the Wanstead Farmers' Co-operative provides grain handling and agricultural services. In 2005, a winery was established near the village of Aberarder.

Multiple gas stations and franchise food chains can be found in the hamlet of Reece's Corners, which serves as a stop along the Ontario Highway 402.

The village of Camlachie is home to two golf courses, serving in part more affluent communities on the Lake Huron shoreline.

Demographics 

Populations prior to amalgamation (2001):
 Population in 1941
 Plympton (township): 2,595
 Wyoming (village): 518
 Population total in 1996: 7,344
 Plympton (township): 5,247
 Wyoming (village): 2,131
 Population in 1991: 
 Plympton (township): 5,275
 Wyoming (village): 2,071

See also
List of townships in Ontario
Wyoming railway station (Ontario)

References

External links

Lower-tier municipalities in Ontario
Populated places established in 2001
Towns in Ontario
Municipalities in Lambton County